Heinrich Elbogen (18 June 1872 – 8 December 1927) was an Austrian sport shooter who competed in the 1912 Summer Olympics.

He was born on 18 June 1872 to a Jewish family in Paris, France, the second child and the only son of banker Guido Elbogen (1845–1918) and his wife Rosalie (Alie) (née Schwabacher; 1850–1940). Of his three sisters, one died in infancy; his youngest sister,  Jenny,  was a noted Esperantist. 

When his father became President of the Anglo-Austrian Bank in Vienna, the family moved to Vienna; his father also bought a country estate, Schloss Thalheim, in Lower Austria, and the family spent their summers there. 

He took part in the 1912 Summer Olympics at Stockholm as a member of the Austrian shooting team, which finished fourth in the team 100 metre running deer, single shots competition. In the 100 metre running deer, single shots event he finished seventh and in the 100 metre running deer, double shots competition he finished 16th.

In 1916, while serving with the Austro-Hungarian Army during the First World War, Elbogen was taken prisoner by the Russians and kept in captivity in Siberia. He returned to Thalheim four years later, exhausted from having made a very long journey home, much of it on foot. 

He died in Vienna on 8 December 1927, aged 55, and is buried at Vienna Central Cemetery.

Notes

References

1872 births
1927 deaths
Austrian male sport shooters
Austrian soldiers
Austro-Hungarian Jews
Austro-Hungarian prisoners of war in World War I
Burials at the Vienna Central Cemetery
Elbogen family
Jewish Austrian sportspeople
Olympic shooters of Austria
Running target shooters
Shooters at the 1912 Summer Olympics
Sport shooters from Paris
Sportspeople from Vienna
World War I prisoners of war held by Russia